The Cleveland Marathon is an annual marathon in Cleveland, Ohio. The  course begins at the corner of St. Clair and 9th and participants have eight hours to finish the race. The first edition was held in 1978. A half marathon, and 10K, including a Corporate Team Challenge, are held concurrently with the full marathon. A 5k race is held on the day before the marathon race day.

At the finish line of the marathon, half marathon, and 10K the  Rock Party is held. This party includes live entertainment, food vendors, and a beer garden.

The first prize in the Marathon event is $3,000 while a prize of $2,000 is on offer for the 10 km run. Among the charities supported by the marathon are The Leukemia & Lymphoma Society and the Cystic Fibrosis Foundation.

In 1993 and 1994, Don Janicki won back-to-back, joining only Pablo Vigil ('80, '81 and later in '88) and Demetrio Cabanillas ('83-85) and consecutive winners. Sarah Kiptoo also had back-to-back victories in 2013 and 2014.

The 2020 edition of the race was cancelled due to the coronavirus pandemic, with all registrants having the option to run the race virtually or transfer their registration to either 2021 or 2022.

References

External links
Cleveland Marathon 
Cleveland Marathon course map
Cleveland Marathon list of historical winners
Cleveland Marathon, findmymarathon.com
Cleveland Marathon, marathonguide.com

Recurring sporting events established in 1976
Marathons in the United States
Sports competitions in Cleveland